Kaarela is a subdistrict in a Western major district of Helsinki, Finland.

Kaarela is split into four subareas: Kannelmäki (12,569 inhabitants), Maununneva (2,501 inhabitants), Malminkartano (8,538 inhabitants) and Hakuninmaa (2,870 inhabitants) and has a total population of 26,414.

References

External links 
 

Neighbourhoods of Helsinki